The Boren family is a prominent American political family from Oklahoma. The family has been described as "Democratic party royalty in Oklahoma" and "a mainstay of Oklahoma and national politics."

The family is one of the most notable in Oklahoma, producing Democratic politicians including Lyle Boren (1909–1992), U.S. Representative for Oklahoma's 4th district from  1937 to 1947, his son David Boren (born 1941), Governor of Oklahoma from 1975 to 1979, U.S. Senator from 1979 to 1994, and President of the University of Oklahoma 1994 to 2018, his grandson Dan Boren (born 1973), a Blue Dog who was the U.S. representative for Oklahoma's 2nd district from 2005 to 2013, and his nephew Jim Boren who was political operative, humorist, and author.

Lyle Boren's sister was Mae Boren Axton, a notable composer who worked with Elvis Presley, Mel Tillis, Reba McEntire, Willie Nelson, Eddy Arnold, Tanya Tucker, Johnny Tillotson, and Blake Shelton and the mother of folk singer and actor Hoyt Axton. Janna Ryan, wife of the 2012 Republican vice-presidential nominee and former Speaker of the United States House of Representatives Paul Ryan, is niece by marriage of David Boren. In addition, Dan Boren's wife, Andrea, is the sister of the former quarterback of the University of Oklahoma, Josh Heupel, who won the national championship with the team in 2000.

Members by generation
First Generation
Lyle Boren, former member of the U.S. House of Representatives from Oklahoma's 4th congressional district (1909-1992)
Mae Boren Axton, music promoter and educator (1914-1997) 
Second Generation
David Boren, son of Lyle Boren,  13th President of the University of Oklahoma, former U.S. Senator for Oklahoma, and 21st Governor of Oklahoma (1941-)
Hoyt Axton, son of Mae Boren Axton singer-songwriter, guitarist, and actor (1938-1999)
James Boren, nephew of Lyle Boren, humorist, politician, and businessman (1925-2010)
Third Generation
Dan Boren, son of David Boren, former member of the U.S. House of Representatives from Oklahoma's 2nd congressional district, and former member of the Oklahoma House of Representatives
Janna Ryan, cousin of Dan Boren
Mary B. Boren, married to Nathan Boren (first cousin once removed of David Boren) and current Oklahoma State Senator

See also 
 List of United States political families

References 

 
Political families of the United States
American families of German ancestry
Families from Oklahoma
Oklahoma Democratic Party